Nozaki Station is the name of two railway stations in Japan:

 Nozaki Station (Osaka)
 Nozaki Station (Tochigi)